The Residential Property Tribunal Service (or RPTS) is the umbrella organisation which provides support for three statutory tribunals and five regional rent assessment panels, all of which make decisions on residential property matters.

The tribunals which form part of the RPTS are:

 Rent assessment committees
 Leasehold valuation tribunals
 Residential property tribunals

External links
 Residential Property Tribunal Service page

Courts of England and Wales
United Kingdom tribunals